Ricard Casas Gurt (born 12 September 1962 in Manresa, Catalonia, Spain) is a Spanish basketball coach for the Spanish team, FC Barcelona

References

External links 
ACB Profile 

Spanish basketball coaches
Catalan basketball coaches
Liga ACB head coaches
Menorca Bàsquet coaches
1962 births
Living people
Sportspeople from Manresa
Valencia Basket coaches